While the Cold War itself never escalated into direct confrontation, there were a number of conflicts and revolutions related to the Cold War around the globe, spanning the entirety of the period usually prescribed to it (March 12, 1947 to December 26, 1991, a total of 44 years, 9 months, and 2 weeks).

Since 1944

Since 1950s

Since 1960s

Since 1970s

Since 1980s

Since 1990s

See also
History of Communism (September 3, 1945 - December 31, 1992)
List of wars 1945-1989

References

Cold War-related lists